This article lists characters from the Rob Zombie's Firefly film series, consisting of House of 1000 Corpses, The Devil's Rejects, and 3 from Hell.

Cast list
 This table shows the recurring characters and the actors who have portrayed them throughout the franchise.
 A dark grey cell indicates the character was not in the film, or that the character's presence in the film has not yet been announced.
 A  indicates an appearance as a younger version of a pre-existing character.
 A  indicates a cameo appearance.
 A  indicates an appearance in onscreen photographs only.
 A  indicates an appearance in deleted scenes only.
 A  indicates a voice role.
 A  indicates an uncredited role.

Firefly family

Captain Spaulding

Portrayed by Sid Haig.
Captain Spaulding, just as several other characters from the series are named after characters from Marx Brothers films, is named for Groucho Marx's character from the musical Animal Crackers and the film of the same name. In House of 1000 Corpses, Spaulding is introduced as a vulgar clown, and the proprietor of a gas station in Texas that sells fried chicken and also serves as a roadside haunted house attraction. In this first film, when a group of four people visit Spaulding's establishment and learn of the local legend of Dr. Satan, Spaulding directs them in the path of the murderous Firefly family. Spaulding's connection to the Firefly clan is kept ambiguous throughout most of the film.

In The Devil's Rejects, Spaulding is established as the patriarch of the Firefly family, and the father of Baby Firefly. At the beginning of the film, the Firefly house is subjected to a search and destroy mission by state troopers, but Spaulding is elsewhere during the raid. Later in the film, Spaulding is captured with Baby Firefly and Otis Driftwood by Sheriff John Wydell and brought to the Firefly house. Wydell tortures them and sets the house on fire, leaving Spaulding and Otis to die, but they are rescued by Tiny Firefly. Spaulding, Baby, and Otis escape by car, and are shot by authorities while speeding towards a police barricade.

In 3 from Hell, Spaulding is revealed to have just barely survived the shootout alongside Otis and Baby, and the trio are put on trial and imprisoned not long after their recovery. Spaulding is executed by lethal injection sometime later, leading to Otis and Baby attempting an escape.

Otis Driftwood

Portrayed by Bill Moseley
Otis is the most depraved and violent member of the Firefly family. He is a sadist who makes the freaks for Captain Spaulding's museum from the victims that he kills. On two occasions in both films, he wore his victims skin as a costume and often fights with Spaulding for control of the family. Although Otis is albino and clean shaven in the first film, Rob didn't think it would fit the style and realism of the sequel, which also saw Otis coming across as less manic and more calculating than he did earlier. In the second film Otis sports a beard, giving him more of a rugged and feral appearance. One feature in both films is Otis' taste for sexual violence: the implication that he is a rapist and necrophiliac with female victims of the first movie is confirmed in the sequel, where he also sexually assaults one of his hostages with a gun (a scene Moseley talks about on the DVD and is visibly horrified by).

Although the family member whose actions are the most monstrous, Otis is not a biological member of the Firefly family at all. Gloria "Mama" Firefly adopted him, but not legally. In the song "Pussy Liquor", the lyrics suggest that Otis' biological father's name is Tim. He is named after the Groucho Marx character in the film A Night at the Opera. He and Baby have a combative relationship and spend much of the sequel screaming at each other during the family's road trip of murder and fleeing from Sheriff Wydell.

After narrowly escaping death at the hands of Sheriff Wydell, Otis was thought to have been killed, along with "Baby" and Capt. Spaulding in a shootout on a deserted highway. A roadblock was set for their capture, and they were shot and taken into custody by Sheriff's deputies. Rather than surrender, the surviving Firefly clan drove speeding towards the roadblock with their guns blazing in one final act of defiance.

Baby Firefly
Portrayed by Sheri Moon Zombie
Besides Mama Firefly, her mother, Baby is the only female member of the Firefly family. In The Devil's Rejects her father is revealed to be Captain Spaulding. In the first film, Mary Knowles describes Baby as being a "slut" and a "redneck whore," which later results in her gruesome demise. In House of 1000 Corpses she hitchhikes and lures the teenagers into visiting the farm (a nod to the classic hitchhiker scene in the 1974 film The Texas Chain Saw Massacre). She shows a liking to Bill that his girlfriend Mary didn't take kindly to which prompted the four to try and leave. After they were captured, she took part in the demise of Bill that involved severing his limbs. Baby approached Jerry wearing one of the dead cheerleader's uniforms and scalped him when he failed to answer who her favorite actor was. Otis, who is the adoptive brother of Baby, was going to shoot Mary when she tried to escape at the ritual ground, but Baby insisted to go after her that resulted in Mary being stabbed to death. She escapes the police in The Devil's Rejects and goes on the rampage with her father and Otis. In the end they are shot and arrested by the police when trying to drive through a roadblock.  In the Rob Zombie song "Pussy Liquor" it is stated that Earl (presumably Earl Firefly/"The Professor") is the biological father of both Baby and Tiny. Baby's actual given name (seen on a wanted poster in The Devil's Rejects) is Vera Ellen, though her mother has also referred to  her daughter as "my Angel".

In 3 From Hell Baby, Otis, and Spaulding barely survive the shooting and fully recover before being sentenced to death row in prison. Spaulding gets executed by lethal injection while Baby and Otis spend 10 years in prison. She is shown to have become even more insane, even hallucinating a cat doing ballet. After Otis and his half-brother Foxy escape the law and have Warden Virgil sneak Baby out of prison before killing him; Baby is shown now to be more independent of herself and controlling, much to Otis's surprise. The trio then decide to move to Mexico as their next escape route. They arrive and have a night partying but are soon under attack by Rondo's son Aquarius. Baby manages to kill most of his hitmen with a bow and arrow she took from Virgil's house. Baby and Foxy are captured and are tied up. While they watch Otis machete battle one of Aquarius's men, Sebastian helps untie them before being fatally shot by a hitman. The trio overthrow Aquarius and then set him on fire right before they walk into the distance.

Tiny Firefly
Portrayed by Matthew McGrory
The younger half-brother of Baby. Suffers from gigantism and is scarred all over because the Professor doused him in lighter fluid and set him alight when he was a child. When the four teenagers tried to leave his family house, he and Otis, who is his adoptive brother, went to attack them. Tiny pulled Denise out of their car and dragged her back in the house while Otis dealt with the rest. Tiny took Denise to his room, where the family dressed her as a doll for Halloween and offered her to him, but did not take advantage of it as he had a soft spot for women. He would however, show no signs of remorse when they were to be killed at a ritual ground that he attended. In the second film, after saving Baby from being murdered, and Otis and Spaulding from the burning Firefly manor, he does not go with the rest of the clan and enters the burning house, where he presumably burns himself to death.

He is referenced frequently in 3 from Hell by Baby; she tells Sebastian he reminds her of him because he was different too. One of her prison tattoos on her right arm is a tombstone that reads "R.I.P. Tiny".

Gloria "Mama" Firefly
 Portrayed by Academy Award-nominee Karen Black in the first film and Leslie Easterbrook in the second.

Mama Firefly (whose real name was Gloria Teasdale) was a prostitute, and the mother of Rufus, Tiny, and Baby. Baby's father is Captain Spaulding, and the father of Rufus is a man named Rufus (which is why his family calls him R.J for Rufus Junior) and the father of Tiny was Earl Firefly. It is revealed in the sequel, that Mother Firefly has a long criminal record, including several cases of prostitution and theft. Mama is captured in the shootout and begins taunting Sheriff Wydell about his dead brother and sexually propositioning him constantly. After one of these occasions Wydell walks into her cell and feigns being seduced by her, before stabbing Mama several times in the stomach.

Rufus "R.J." Firefly
Portrayed by Robert Allen Mukes in House of 1000 Corpses and by Tyler Mane in The Devil's Rejects
A member of the Firefly family, namely Tiny's older brother. Rufus was abnormally tall, and often shot down nearby cars so their drivers would have to stop by the Firefly house for help. His father was a man named Rufus, hence Rufus Jr. or R.J. He was a fairly minor character in House of 1000 Corpses. In The Devil's Rejects, Rufus defended the house from police covered in homemade steel body armor. In the end of the assault, Rufus fought alone while the others retreated and was shot multiple times by Wydell and his men. He is named after the Groucho Marx character in the film Duck Soup.

House of 1000 Corpses

Hugo Firefly
Portrayed by Dennis Fimple.

Grandpa Hugo is arguably one of the more harmless members of the Firefly family.  It assumed he is the father of Gloria "Mama" Firefly and the grandfather of Rufus, Tiny, and Baby. He never murders anyone and does not engage in any acts of sadism or cruelty.  Rather, he just seems to be a harmless (albeit dirty) old man.

Grandpa Hugo has a penchant for crude, sexual humor and loves telling dirty jokes.  He is usually seen watching TV and yelling at the screen. He is named after the Groucho Marx character in the film A Day at the Races.

Fimple died not long after House Of 1000 Corpses was completed.  Zombie omitted his role from the sequel, The Devil's Rejects, out of respect.

In an early cut of the film, Grandpa Hugo was revealed to be none other than Dr. Satan himself.  Supposedly, the whole legend of Dr. Satan was to be a ruse concocted by the Firefly family to attract more victims, and Grandpa Hugo played the role of the sinister physician. Zombie later scrapped this idea, saying it would be too anticlimactic, and would rather have the real Dr. Satan show up in the film's climax instead.

Lieutenant George Wydell
Portrayed by Tom Towles.

Investigating the disappearance of four missing teenagers, he interrogated Captain Spaulding, the owner of the gas station and freak show museum where the kids were last seen. Spaulding directed him to the site of the infamous Doctor Satan murders. Spaulding, who was later established as a member of the Firefly family, would later admit that he deliberately sent them to their doom.

With fellow police officer Deputy Steve Nash and Don Willis, one the teens' fathers and a former officer himself, he sought out the Firefly House. Nash and Willis went out back to investigate, but Wydell himself went to talk to a hesitant Mother Firefly for questioning.

He showed several pictures of the missing teenagers, but Mother Firefly claimed to know nothing about them. He was about to leave, when Nash called him on his walkie talkie. He and Willis had discovered a small shack outside the house where some of the teens were being locked up, right before Otis B. Driftwood killed them both. Before Wydell could do anything, Mother Firefly pulled out a gun and shot him in the neck, killing him.

In the Devil's Rejects his brother Sheriff John Wydell discovers that George was killed by the Firefly family and is hellbent on revenge. Tom Towles reprises his role as George Wydell in a cameo appearance in one of his brother's dreams. In it, Sheriff Wydell goes to the basement of the Firefly House where George is waiting for him. He tells him he has to stay there and cannot rest until his brother kills the Firefly family.

Dr. Satan / S. Quentin Quale
Portrayed by Walter Phelan
Local legend of Ruggsville, Texas, Captain Spaulding tells the legend of Dr. Satan – S. Quentin Quale, an intern at the "Willows County Mental Hospital". Through primitive brain surgery he believed he could create a race of "super-humans" from the mentally ill. When the locals discovered what he had been doing, they formed a mob and hanged him, the next day his body was missing, never to be found. From then on he had been living in the catacombs under the Firefly farm, continuing operations on people the family would lure to their home.  He is named after the Groucho Marx character in the film Go West.

In Otis B. Driftwood's biography on The Devil's Rejects official site, a different tale is told. Here we find that he and Baby were drawn into a cult led by Dr. Satan. Otis and Baby, were later expelled by the leader of this cult, after they murdered one of the cult's leaders with an axe following a dispute over a bottle of whiskey.

In an early cut of the film, Grandpa Hugo was revealed to be none other than Dr. Satan himself. Supposedly, the whole legend of Dr. Satan was to be a ruse concocted by the Firefly family to attract more victims, and Grandpa Hugo played the role of the sinister physician. Zombie later scrapped this idea, saying it would be too anticlimactic, and would rather have the real Dr. Satan show up in the film's climax instead.

Dr. Satan did not appear in the sequel. Rob Zombie said he felt uncomfortable having him in the film, saying that the character would seem too out of place given the drastically different tone of the two movies. However Dr. Satan did appear in deleted scenes. According to Rob Zombie's commentary on the DVD, he was wounded in the opening shootout and was taken away to a hospital. (Doctor Satan is apparently in the ambulance during the opening scenes.) A nurse (played by Rosario Dawson) checks the doctor, now in a coma, when suddenly he awakes, grabs her throat and brutally tears it open before collapsing back onto the bed and possibly dying.

The actor who portrayed Dr. Satan (Walter Phalen) also makes an appearance as Tiny in a flashback sequence to when The Professor sets him on fire.

Denise Willis
Portrayed by Erin Daniels

The daughter of retired sheriff Don Willis who travels to the site of Dr. Satans burial with her three friends. Of the four she is the most logical and manages to escape the Firefly family only to be captured moments later by Captain Spaulding and presumably killed by the mad doctor himself as her fate is left ambiguous.

Earl "The Professor" Firefly
Portrayed by Jake McKinnon.
Earl "The Professor" Firefly is a large hulking mutant who worked with Dr. Satan. "The Professor" is a Harpo Marx character, fitting in with the rest of the Firefly family. He was Mama Firefly's husband, who she considered a good man. One day, he went insane and tried to burn the house down, accidentally disfiguring Tiny in the process. He is never seen in The Devil's Rejects; however, he is shown in House of a 1000 Corpses in flashbacks and near the end when he chases Denise through the catacombs with an axe. It is never clarified why he, or any of Dr. Satan's other mutants for that matter, are not shown in The Devils Rejects.

Ravelli
Played by Irwin Keyes
Ravelli is Captain Spaulding's sidekick and the mascot for the Museum of Monsters and Madmen. His connection to the Firefly family is left ambiguous, but as he is seen helping Spaulding kill a defenseless Killer Karl, it is likely he is aware of their activities.

Killer Karl and Richard Wick
Portrayed by Chad Bannon and David Reynolds
A duo of bumbling armed robbers. Killer Karl is violent and nearly kills Captain Spaulding, while Wick is emotionally unstable and works at a hardware store. While attempting a robbery at Spaulding's gas station, both Spaulding and Stucky begin mocking them. Stucky identified Wick and begins taunting him with his nickname "Little Dick" Wick, and Karl prepared to kill Spaulding. Before he can do so, Ravelli knocks him to the floor, allowing Spaulding to shoot them both.

Bill Hudley
Portrayed by Rainn Wilson
Bill Hudley was a college student traveling the country with his girlfriend Mary and friends Jerry and Denise. Bill went with them to Dr. Satan's alleged burial site, picking up Baby, who lured them to the Firefly home and flirted with Bill. Otis knocks him unconscious when he tries to leave, and mutilates him to make him into a work of art for the museum called  "Fish Boy".

Steve Naish
Portrayed by Walton Goggins
A county deputy who accompanied George Wydell in investigating the Firefly residence to question them about the disappearance of several people. When Steve realizes the Fireflys are serial killers, Otis shoots him in the head.

Stucky
Portrayed by Michael J. Pollard
Stucky is an elderly man and friend of Captain Spaulding. He arrived at his gas station to show Spaulding his autograph collection, only to be involved in an armed robbery. Stucky recognizes one of the robbers as Richard Wick, and begins taunting Wick with his nickname. Ravelli then bursts in and incapacitates Karl, allowing Spaulding to kill them. Stucky's knowledge of the Firefly family's activities is left ambiguous, though the robbery seems to imply he is.

Jerry Goldsmith
Portrayed by Chris Hardwick
Jerry Goldsmith was a wisecracking teenager, joining his girlfriend Denise Willis and friends Bill Hudley and Mary Knowles in a road trip. Jerry is fascinated by Captain Spaulding's Murder Ride, and happily makes his friends go to Dr. Satan's alleged burial site. Jerry is the only one of the group to enjoy their time with the Fireflies; still, he is captured and partially scalped by Baby. He is captured by Dr. Satan's minions, and killed when Dr. Satan performs exploratory brain surgery on him.

Mary Knowles
Played by Jennifer Jostyn
Mary Knowles was a snotty and sarcastic teen and Bill's girlfriend. Despite her disinterest in Captain Spaulding's Murder Ride, she goes on. She joins her friends in driving to Dr. Satan's burial site, and immediately develops an enmity with Baby for her advances on Bill. After being captured by the Fireflys, Mary is forced to see Bill's corpse by Otis, who then beats her for insulting him. Soon all three are dressed in rabbit costumes and taken to a graveyard, where Mary breaks free and runs off, only to be caught by Baby, who violently stabs her to death.

In The Devil's Rejects a photograph of her is stapled onto Baby's chest by Sheriff Wydell.

Sheriff Frank Huston
 Portrayed by William Bassett
Frank Huston is the sheriff of Ruggsville. Huston joins in the search for Denise and her friends. Huston is not present during the search at the Firefly family's house, and is thus not killed by them.

The Devil's Rejects

Sheriff John Quincey Wydell
Portrayed by William Forsythe.
Sheriff Wydell led a siege on the Firefly house, hoping to arrest the serial killer family that lived inside. After a brutal shootout, he managed to kill Rufus and capture Mother Firefly, but two of the most dangerous members of the family, Otis B. Driftwood and Baby managed to escape, who later reunited with Baby's father, Captain Spaulding.

He interrogated Mother Firefly for whereabouts of her kin, but the family matriarch refused. Instead, she revealed to him that she had killed his brother, Lieutenant George Wydell, taunting him by saying "I felt contrite about blowin' his brains out". Furious, Wydell promised to her that he would kill every member of her family.

After hiring two amoral bounty hunters called the 'Unholy Two' to track down the Devil's Rejects, he became witness to the aftermath of the brutal murders of Banjo and Sullivan, a traveling country band.

After a dream about his dead brother telling him to kill the Firefly family, Wydell revisited Mother Firefly again, only this time to stab her to death.

Upon finding out that the escaped killers had taken shelter at a whorehouse, he tracked down the owner, Captain Spaulding's pimp brother Charlie Altamont and told him to keep the family there so he could ambush them.

With the help of the Unholy Two, he managed to capture the Rejects and bring them to their house. Becoming increasingly disturbed by his vengeance, the Sheriff brought them to their basement and tied them to a bunch of chairs. There, he proceeded to sadistically torture them like they had done to their victims throughout the night. He nailed Otis's hands to his chair, he electrocuted and beat Spaulding with a cattle prod, and he taunted Baby over the death of her mother after stapling a picture of one of her victims to her chest.

After dousing the room with gasoline and leaving Spaulding and Otis to burn, Wydell let Baby escape so he could track her down and kill her. Charlie returned to save his family but Wydell killed him with an axe.

Wydell proceeded to shoot Baby, flog her, and then tried to strangle her to death. It was only the return of Tiny that finally stopped Wydell. The mute giant picked up the Sheriff and snapped his neck, ultimately killing him.

Charlie Altamont
Portrayed by Ken Foree.
Charlie Altamont (alias 'Wolf J. Flywheel') is Captain Spaulding's African American half-brother and a pimp. Charlie runs a brothel and strip club and was a pimp by profession, and he also has a cocaine addiction.  To emphasize his style as a pimp, he was given a large amount of valuable and suggestive paraphernalia; it was not on camera, but in a scene where he was sharing his cocaine with Cutter, he had a necklace that was a cocaine spoon in the shape of a naked woman. When the Firefly family are on the run from the police, they come to Charlie for refuge. But when Sheriff Wydell tracks him down, Charlie is pressured to give his family up. Charlie returns later to save his family, but Wydell attacks and kills him with an axe while he tries to save Baby.

The Unholy Two
Portrayed by Danny Trejo and Dallas Page.
Two amoral bounty hunters hired to track down the Rejects. Rondo is Mexican and the more business savvy of the two, describing Wydell's situation with the rejects as the U2 working as exterminators to wipe out the cockroach-like Devil's Rejects. Billy Ray Snapper is the more quick to action type guy whose main pleasure is a good fight, and he and Wydell don't like each other. Though some may be fooled by their biker persona's and unfashionable lifestyle, the Unholy Two are tactical and relentless when on a hunt and will gladly kill anyone between them and their targets, along with the targets themselves. The Unholy Two capture the Fireflys and deliver them to Wydell after killing many of Charlie's prostitutes before departing.

In 3 from Hell, 10 years after Devil's Rejects, Rondo is seen in prison digging ditches with Otis but does not remember him. Otis soon escapes prison and shoots Rondo in the head, killing him.

Ray Dobson
Portrayed by Dave Sheridan
Ray Dobson is a police officer and Wydell's right-hand man. Dobson appears to be much more reasonable and level headed than Wydell, though Dobson is unaware of Wydell's illegal and unsavory actions. Dobson takes over the hunt for the Fireflys shortly after Wydell is killed and leads the roadblock that(supposedly) kills Otis, Baby, and Captain Spaulding.

Roy Sullivan
Portrayed by Geoffrey Lewis
Roy Sullivan is the lead singer of Banjo & Sullivan and the husband of Gloria Sullivan. Roy often badmouths Jimmy and claims to have once partnered with Johnny Cash. Roy encounters Baby while getting beer, and Baby attempts to seduce him. Otis then holds Roy at gunpoint and takes the band captive. Otis then takes Roy and Adam with him to unearth a cache of weapons Otis had buried nearby. Upon realizing Otis intended to kill them, Adam and Roy attack Otis only to be fought off. Otis then beats Roy to death with a large branch.

Adam Banjo
Portrayed by Lew Temple
Adam Banjo is the guitarist for Banjo & Sullivan and the husband of Wendy Banjo. Adam dismisses a news report on the Fireflys to be exaggerated, only to be almost immediately attacked after by the Fireflys. After being captured by Baby and Otis, Otis takes a special dislike to Adam. Otis holds Adam and Roy at gunpoint and forces them to help him unearth a cache of weapons he had buried nearby. Upon realizing Otis intended to kill them, Adam attacks Otis only to be shot in the throat. Otis then brutally attacks Adam for “being a hero”, and cuts off Adam's face while Adam defiantly screams out profanity at Otis.

Wendy Banjo
Portrayed by Kate Norby
Wendy Banjo is a member of Banjo & Sullivan and Adam's wife. Wendy is taking a shower when Otis and Baby take the band captive. After Otis takes Adam and Roy out of the room at gunpoint, Wendy is forced to humiliate herself in front of Baby and punch Gloria in the face so she can go to the bathroom. Wendy manages to get out of the room, only to be knocked unconscious by Captain Spaulding. Otis ties Wendy to the door and puts Adam's face on her before Spaulding, Otis, and Baby leave. Wendy is later discovered by a maid and begs for help, but the maid mistakes her for attempting to attack her and runs off. Wendy runs out into the highway where she is run over by a passing semi-truck.

Gloria Sullivan
Portrayed by Priscilla Barnes

Candy
Portrayed by E. G. Daily

Cleavon
Portrayed by Michael Berryman

Jimmy
Portrayed by Brian Posehn
Jimmy is the roadie for Banjo & Sullivan. Jimmy is a stoner, and is often put down by Roy. Jimmy expresses his desires to be a rodeo clown or a part of a pit crew. Jimmy leaves Banjo & Sullivan to get food from a nearby gas station, leading to him not being help captive by Otis and Baby. Jimmy later returns, only to be shot in the head by Otis.

Fanny
Portrayed by Ginger Lynn Allen

Morris Green
Portrayed by Daniel Roebuck
Morris Green is a local talk show host. Green is seen interviewing an occult specialist about the Fireflys’ crimes, under the apparent belief that the Fireflys are a cult.

Abbie
Portrayed by Mary Woronov
A motorist who sees Baby having apparently collapsed on the road shortly after the assault on the Fireflys. Abbie gets out of her car and checks on Baby, who reveals herself to be alive before Abbie is killed by Otis.

Susan
Portrayed by PJ Soles

Susan was a mother who had stopped at Buck's Grab 'n Go and had her car stolen by Captain Spaulding.

Casey
Portrayed by Deborah Van Valkenburgh

Jamie
Portrayed by Jordan Orr

Jamie was the young son of Susan. Captain Spaulding terrified the child to tears when he stole his mother's car.

3 From Hell

Winslow "Foxy" Coltrane
 Portrayed By Richard Brake
Winslow "Foxy" Coltrane is the half-brother of Otis and Baby Firefly. Prior to the events of the film, he was known to have committed a series of crimes which earned him the nickname the “Midnight Wolfman”. He helps free his brother Otis from a chain gang by shooting the guards and inmates. They then take Warden Harper’s family hostage so that he will get Baby out of prison.

Warden Virgil Dallas Harper
Portrayed by Jeff Daniel Phillips
Warden Virgil Dallas Harper was the warden of the prison that housed the Three. He was shot in the head and killed by Otis Driftwood during the plan to get Baby out of prison.

Greta
Portrayed by Dee Wallace

A female prison guard who works in a facility where Baby is Incarcerated. She has a mad hatred for Baby, one reason for punching her in the nose in one scene. She later attempts to have Baby killed by 2 female prisoners, but Baby outwits them and kills them instead. Later on after Otis & Foxy take Warden Virgil's wife and friends hostage in his own house, Otis instructs him to sneak Baby out or else he'll kill them all. Virgil calls Greta to bring Baby up to his office. After that she leaves Baby alone with Virgil who uncuffs her and makes her wear a prison guard uniform. Greta walks back in for Baby and is strangled to death by her.

Aquarius
 Portrayed by Emilio Rivera

References

Firefly
Firefly (film series)